Troy Andes (born April 16, 1981, in Pittsburgh, Pennsylvania) is an American politician and a Republican member of the West Virginia House of Delegates representing District 58 since January 12, 2013. Andes served consecutively from January 2007 until January 2013 in a District 14 seat.

Education
Andes earned his BS from Virginia Tech and his MBA from Marshall University.

Elections
2012 Redistricted to District 15, and with its incumbents redistricted to District 16, Andes was challenged in the May 8, 2012 Republican Primary, winning with 1,792 votes (82.0%), and was unopposed for the November 6, 2012 General election, winning with 7,004 votes.
2006 When District 14 Republican Representative Mike Hall ran for West Virginia Senate and left a district seat open, Andes placed in the five-way 2006 Republican Primary and was elected in the three-way two-position November 7, 2006 General election against Democratic nominee Gene Estel.
2008 Andes and fellow Republican incumbent Representative Patti Schoen were unopposed for the May 13, 2008 Republican Primary, where Andes placed first with 2,337 votes (52.2%), and placed first in the four-way two-position November 4, 2008 General election with 9,323 votes (31.4%) ahead of Representative Schoen and Democratic nominees Jeffrey Martin and Karen Corea.
2010 When Representative Schoen retired and left a district seat open, Andes placed first in the five-way May 11, 2010 Republican Primary, winning with 2,034 votes (42.8%), and placed first in the three-way two-position November 2, 2010 General election with 8,159 votes (40.3%) ahead of fellow Republican nominee Brian Savilla and Democratic nominee Catherine Larck.

References

External links
Official page at the West Virginia Legislature

Troy Andes at Ballotpedia
Troy Andes at the National Institute on Money in State Politics

1981 births
Living people
Marshall University alumni
Republican Party members of the West Virginia House of Delegates
People from Hurricane, West Virginia
Politicians from Pittsburgh
Virginia Tech alumni